Super Junior-M (stylized as SJ-M; an initialism for Super Junior-Mandarin), is a Chinese sub-group and the third overall sub-group of the South Korean boy band Super Junior. The group is the first international music group in the Chinese music industry to have members of both Chinese and Korean descent.

Formed in 2008, Super Junior-M became the third and most successful subgroup branched off from the Korean band Super Junior. The group originally composed of seven members: leader Han Geng, Donghae, Siwon, Ryeowook, Kyuhyun and two additional members appearing exclusively to the subgroup, Zhou Mi and Henry. In December 2009, Han Geng filed a lawsuit against SM Entertainment and decided to leave the main group and sub-group, resulting in the sub-group's temporary disbandment.

After a year-long hiatus, the group returned with addition Super Junior members Eunhyuk and Sungmin, following with the released of their second EP Perfection in February 2011. Following Han Geng's leave, the group considers that Sungmin as the new "leader", as he is the oldest member of the team. However, SM Entertainment has not released any statements about electing a new group leader.

In 2015, the group halted group promotions following of the Korean members began their military service and since then the group has been inactive.

On April 30, 2018, Henry left SM after his contract expired and effectively left the group.

History

Name origin
Before the official name of the subgroup was released, they were known by "Super Junior China". On April 3, 2008, SM Entertainment announced their official name to be Super Junior-M, with "M" representing the word "Mandarin". The "M" can also represent a list of other aspects, such as the first letter of their debut album Me, and also "", the pinyin for "charismatic" and "fan", the latter meaning referring to their desire to connect closer with fans.

2007: Formation and controversies
In October 2007, SM Entertainment announced that a new Super Junior subgroup would debut in China in 2008. Super Junior's original member Han Geng, and a new member Henry Lau, who performed the violin solo of Super Junior's "Don't Don", were announced to be the first two of seven members representing the subgroup. Some of Super Junior's official fanclub, E.L.F, signed online petitions and held protests to express their dissatisfaction and opposition of adding a fourteenth member to the group, fearing that a new member would mean one of the original lineup would get 'replaced'. Many fans boycotted Super Junior's products and held silent protests in front of SM Entertainment's main building in Seoul, holding signs of the "Only 13" slogan.

Over one thousand fans appeared in front of the SM Entertainment building on E.L.F's third protest on November 3, 2007. Instead of a silent protest, the fans sang various Super Junior songs and shouted "thirteen." Fans purchased 58,206 stocks of SM Entertainment, holding 0.3% of the company's entire stock. They released a statement through the media, stating that they would obtain all chances to prevent SM Entertainment from adding new members and to keep Super Junior as only thirteen. SM Entertainment later announced that they would not add the new subgroup members to the main group.

2008–2009: Debut and commercial success
From April 4 to April 7, 2008, the seven members of Super Junior-M were individually announced to the Chinese media in a chain of short trailer clips. The first member, Han Geng, was announced to be the subgroup leader on April 4. On April 5, Siwon and Donghae were revealed to be the second and third members. On April 6, Kyuhyun was announced to be the fourth Super Junior-M member, following the new member, Henry, as the fifth. Ryeowook and another new member, Zhou Mi, were announced to be the final two members on April 7. A trailer of all seven members was released on the group's debut day, April 8. Super Junior-M's trailer clips exceeded 1.4 million views in less than four days.

Super Junior-M debuted in Beijing on April 8, 2008, at the 8th Annual Music Chart Awards, simultaneously with the release of their first music video, "U" on Sohu.com. "U" is a translated Chinese cover of the 2006 song "U", originally by Super Junior.  They released their debut album Me in selected provinces of China starting April 23, 2008. A Korean version of the album with three bonus Korean-language tracks was released in South Korea on April 30, 2008. A modified version of the album was released in Hong Kong, Singapore, and Taiwan on May 2, 2008. Though a majority of the tracks in the album were Mandarin remakes of Super Junior's previous Korean hits, reviews were generally positive. Hong Kong Cantopop singer, Hins Cheung, critiqued the album favorably, saying that the album contains "international-level music" and that the group is "vocally-talented".

A month after their debut, Super Junior-M won their first award, Asia's Most Popular New Group, at the 5th annual Music King Awards in Macau on May 25. They took home another three awards that year. On December 27 and 28, Super Junior-M held their first concert, the Super Junior-M Show, in Hong Kong.

Following their debut performance in April 2008, the group made a few successful guest appearances in many chains of entertainment variety shows to promote their album. They appeared in an episode of the second season of TVB and HunanTV's collaboration show, Strictly Come Dancing, which made the show's ratings increase to 5.01%, ranking it the third most watched show ever in all of China. Super Junior-M's appearance in the talk show Behind Story also increased ratings. The show had the highest ratings during their time slot, with a strong 4.05%. Separated into several weekly episodes, the group's appearance in their first episode on the challenging game show Bravely Going Forward in early August gave the show the highest ratings during that time slot as well. In August 2008, Han was cast in the idol television drama Stage of Youth, a mini-drama dedicated to the 2008 Beijing Olympics. Han portrayed Xia Lei, a youth who aspires to be a famous dancer. Other members of Super Junior-M gave cameo appearances in the final episode.

In September 2009, Super Junior-M released their mini album, the EP Super Girl. The album garnered them a nomination for Best Vocal Group at the 21st Golden Melody Awards. The EP's title single "Super Girl" is Super Junior-M's most critically successful song to date, winning numerous accolades for its composition and performances.

2010–2011: Lawsuit, lineup changes and Perfection
In December 2009, Hangeng filed for contract termination from SM Entertainment, claiming that the provisions of his contract were unlawful, harsh, and against his rights. Super Junior-M immediately canceled all of their future activities and performances in China and Taiwan. They returned to Korea to begin preparing for Super Junior's fourth studio album. Han, however, stayed in China and signed under a new management, releasing his debut solo album Geng Xin in July 2010. Although Super Junior-M remained largely inactive for most of 2010, they won several accolades for their song "Super Girl" at China's 2010 MusicRadio TOP Awards, including Most Popular Group, Golden Melody Award (Top 15), and Best Composition.

In December 2010, the Seoul Central District Court ruled in favor of Han. However, SM Entertainment announced that they will file an immediate appeal to reverse the decision. In September 2011, Han and SM Entertainment officially came to a mutual agreement regarding Han's contract, closing the case.

In February 2011, Super Junior-M resumed their activities with two new members from the main group, Eunhyuk and Sungmin, with the release of EP Perfection. It debuted at number 2 on Taiwan's G-music chart, and stayed on the chart for four weeks. The repackaged version of the album was released on April 29, debuted at number 2, and stayed on the chart for 10 weeks.

2013–2018: Break Down, Swing, and Henry's departure
In 2012 the group resumed their activities in China when they performed on 2 October, along with Kim Jang-hoon and EXO-M in a special concert to mark the 20th anniversary of South Korea and China's diplomatic ties hosted by Shanghai Media Group. This was followed by official from SM Entertainment confirming that the group are in the planning stages of their comeback with a new album. On January 7, 2013, Super Junior-M released their second album, Break Down, along with the music video for the lead single of the same name. A press conference took place in Beijing on January 7 and promoted the album in China. They promoted the album in South Korean mutizens for a week as well different Fan Meetings in Asia. The song debuted No.1 on the Billboard charts.

After one year and three months since their second album 'Break Down', Super Junior-M released their third EP album, Swing in China on March 21. Previously on March 18, 2014, Super Junior-M had unveiled the teaser image for the EP. A press conference was held on March 22 in Beijing, which was broadcast live online and viewed by over a million people. The album was later released on Korean music sites, such as MelOn, genie, Naver music and more, on March 31. They held their first comeback stage on China's CCTV's 'Global Chinese Music List' and continued in Korea, performing on music programs for 2 weeks. The title song, Swing, is a pop dance song that mixes in both R&B and electro sounds. The album contains six Chinese songs, produced by hit makers Yoo Han Jin, hitchhiker and Henry's team of composers, NoizeBank, as well as the Korean version of Swing. The music video for Swing debuted on Chinese video sites Youku, Weibo, and iQIYI on March 23, before being released on YouTube on March 24. In 2015, Sungmin began a military service. The rest of members recorded a song titled "" (Forever with You) in Super Junior's album Devil. Then, the group began a hiatus.

On March 31, 2018, Super Junior-M's parent group Super Junior held its seventh world tour Super Show 7 in Taipei. Member Donghae mentioned that Super Junior-M plans to release new album after all members return to the team in 2019, but never came to fruition following the fandom's boycott on Sungmin.

On April 30, 2018, Henry decided not to renew his contract with SM Entertainment, and left Super Junior-M.

Members
In December 2009, Hangeng departed from the group after filing a lawsuit against their agency S.M. Entertainment. Hangeng subsequently won the lawsuit in December 2010.

In April 2018, Henry parted ways with the group after a decade. SM Entertainment revealed, “Henry’s exclusive contract recently expired, and we have ended on good terms.” Henry has completed his contract with SM Entertainment and he has decided to leave the agency.

Between March 2015 to August 2017, four members completed their mandatory military service: Sungmin enlisted for his service on 31 March 2015, and completed his service on 30 December 2016. 
Eunhyuk enlisted for his service on 13 October 2015 and was discharged on 12 July 2017. 
Donghae enlisted for his service on 15 October 2015 and was discharged on 14 July 2017. 
Siwon enlisted for his service on 19 November 2015 and was discharged on 18 August 2017.

From August 2017 to present, two members enlisted for mandatory military service. Ryeowook enlisted for his service on 11 October 2016 and was discharged 10 July 2018. Kyuhyun enlisted on 25 May 2017 and was discharged on 7 May 2019.

Current active members
Eunhyuk
Zhou Mi
Donghae
Siwon
Ryeowook
Kyuhyun

Current inactive members
Sungmin 

Former members
Han Geng
Henry

Timeline

Discography

Studio albums

Extended plays

Singles

Soundtrack appearances

Videography

Awards and nominations

Notes

References

External links 

 Super Junior-M Official Korean website

Super Junior subgroups
Avex Group artists
Chinese boy bands
Chinese dance music groups
K-pop music groups
Mandarin-language singers of South Korea
Mandopop musical groups
Musical groups established in 2008
Musical groups from Seoul
SM Entertainment artists
SM Town
South Korean boy bands
South Korean dance music groups
South Korean contemporary R&B musical groups
South Korean synthpop groups